Dovecliffe railway station was situated on the South Yorkshire Railway's Blackburn Valley line between  and Wombwell Main Junction.

History
The station opened with the line on 4 September 1854 and closed on 7 December 1953.  The line through the station remained open until the 1986 to allow freight access to Barrow Colliery, although the through line to Sheffield was severed between Birdwell and Westwood in the late 1960s with the construction of the M1 motorway.

The station was originally named Smithley for Darley Main & Worsborough  but its name was changed by the end of 1855 to Darkcliffe and again in early 1860 to Dovecliffe. It was controlled by a signal box which sat on the station roof. When the line opened, as a single line, there was no block working and when a box was needed it was required to be placed on the outer side of a bend to give better visibility. With the station buildings being very close to the level crossing the only place where the box could be erected was on the station roof.

Route

References
"The South Yorkshire Railway", D. L. Franks. Turntable Enterprises, 1971. 
Various articles by D. L. Franks which appeared in "Forward", the journal of the Great Central Railway Society, 

Disused railway stations in Barnsley
Railway stations in Great Britain opened in 1854
Railway stations in Great Britain closed in 1953
Former South Yorkshire Railway stations
1854 establishments in England